Marijan (also Romanized as Marījān) is a village in Larijan-e Sofla Rural District, Larijan District, Amol County, Mazandaran Province, Iran. At the 2006 census, its population was 15, in 7 families.

References 

Populated places in Amol County